Booktopia Pty Ltd is an Australian online bookstore. Founded in 2004, it now turns over $165 million a year, and was listed in the AFR/BRW's Fast 100 eight times, the only company to ever achieve this feat, from 2009 to 2017. In 2016, 2017 & 2019 Booktopia was voted 'Bookstore of the Year'. In 2018 it won NSW Telstra Business of the Year and the Australian Telstra Business Award People's Choice Award. It has been a finalist in the Telstra Business Awards seven times from 2011 to 2018, the only company to achieve this feat. Booktopia has stated that Australian authors and titles are a key focus for the company.

Booktopia completed a $20 million capital raise at the beginning of 2020.

History
Booktopia was founded on 4 February 2004 by Tony Nash, Steve Traurig, and Simon Nash in Sydney, Australia. Tony started the business as a side project.

They started on a $10 per day budget and took three days to sell the first book, but then the business grew rapidly. After the first month, sales were at $2,000. By the fourth month, sales were up to $30K per month, and at year's end, $100K per month. After a second year, sales doubled again to $200,000 per month.

In the first three years, all of the website and fulfilment were outsourced. In 2007, the founders decided to build their own website and do their own fulfilment. They moved to 450 square metres (5,000 square feet) in Artarmon, bought some shelves on eBay, and hired a warehouse manager. In 2009, Booktopia moved to 2,000 square metres (22,000 square feet) in Lane Cove because they wanted to hold more stock and sales were too high for existing space. In 2011, they leased a further 2,000 square metres (22,000 square feet) down the road.

In 2014, it moved to 10,000 square metres (100,000 square feet) in Lidcombe and implemented $4 million worth of automation, conveyors, automatic packing machines and scanners.

In 2016, they increased their space when an adjoining building became available adding a further 3,000 square metres and added another 1,000 sqm mezzanine. Total space is currently 14,000 square metres (154,000 square feet).

Investment in automation has increased to $22 million as of 2020. At Christmas 2019, the distribution centre was inbounding and out-bounding up to 38,000 individual items per day.

In August 2015, Booktopia bought the Angus & Robertson business from Penguin Random House.

Sales revenue for the 2019/20 financial year were $165.4 million per annum. They hold 148,000 in stock titles ready-to-ship and sell one item every 6.1 seconds.

In 2018, Booktopia won NSW Business of the Year at the Telstra Business Awards and at the Nationals they won the People's Choice Award.

In 2016, 2017, and 2019 Booktopia won National Book Retailer of the Year at the Australian Book Industry Awards. This award is voted on by publishers, authors and other industry experts.

Booktopia is the only company ever to make the AFR/BRW Fast 100 for 8 years from 2009 to 2017. The company has won countless other awards including Australia's number 1 online bookstore and is currently Australia's Favourite Bookstore as voted by the Australian public.

In 2017, Booktopia launched Booktopia Publisher Services (BPS), a book distribution business where publishers appoint BPS to be its distributor for Australia and New Zealand. Some of the publishers that have appointed BPS as its ANZ distributor are Sage, Corwin, Human Kinetics, Kogan Page, Rebel Girls, O'Reilly, New Harbinger, Oxford University Press (specific international titles), SPCK, Moody Publishers, Chelsea Green Publishing, Thieme and many others. Over 600 bookshops and businesses buy books through BPS.

Booktopia's publishing business Booktopia Publishing was launched in 2019. It publishes authors from Australia and around the world. 

In 2020, Booktopia launched a joint venture with Rakuten Kobo to provide eBook and downloadable audiobooks through the Booktopia/Rakuten Kobo app.

Booktopia's philanthropic program has donated over $1 million worth of books and cash to literacy based projects including indigenous literacy. It has sponsored writers' festivals, readers conferences, book awards, library fundraising projects and many other school fundraisers. In 2020 it purchased The Co-op Bookshop's on-line business from its administrator.

Booktopia listed on the ASX in December 2020 at an issue price of 2.30 AUD. From a high of 3 AUD in August 2021, the company's share price steadily crashed to reach 0.17 AUD in June 2022; Booktopia suggested this was due to a decline in business faced by online retailers after the lifting of pandemic restrictions.

CEO Tony Nash sold $6 million worth of his shares on December 6 2021, shortly before the company announced it was anticipating a drop in earnings. Amidst investor ire over the timing of this sale as well as plunging earnings, in May 2022 Nash announced that he would be stepping down from his role as CEO once a replacement had been found. In July however, the company's board forced Nash to step down earlier than expected, appointing CFO Geoff Stalley as his interim replacement. In August, Nash announced that he intended to spill the board, hoping to remove the chairman and other members. In late August, the company was also forced to pay $6 million by the Australian Competition & Consumer Commission on the grounds that it had misrepresented consumers' rights to refunds and returns.

References

External links

Bookshops of Australia
Book selling websites
Companies listed on the Australian Securities Exchange
Retail companies established in 2004
Australian companies established in 2004